Wilbur R. "Shorty" Jamerson (May 27, 1929 – December 9, 1994) was an American football player and coach.

Playing career
Jamerson was a running back for legendary coach Paul "Bear" Bryant at the University of Kentucky, lettering four times between 1947 and 1950. He scored two touchdown in the 1951 Sugar Bowl to beat the Oklahoma Sooners, 13–7, and end their 31-game winning streak.

Coaching career
He served as the head football coach at Morehead State University from 1953 to 1955.

Later life and death
After retiring from collegiate coaching, he served a school administrator, most notably at Wheelwright High School. His former coach, Bear Bryant, said of him, "Jamerson is the best ball carrier I've had in the past five years. Had he not been injured in the early part of the season, he would have been All-American. Although he is a good football player, I'm prouder of him for his other activities. He is one of the finest leaders any team could have."

Shorty and his wife, Virginia (Buddy), spent their lives in education, improving the lives of kids who came through the school system in Wheelwright, Kentucky. Buddy was the principal of the elementary school and Shorty was principal of the high school. But in addition to being the principal, he was the bus driver, football coach, and most importantly, a mentor to all he knew. He was kind and loving to everyone.

He died in 1994 at the age of 65.

Head coaching record

References

1929 births
1994 deaths
American football running backs
Kentucky Wildcats football players
Morehead State Eagles football coaches